Brad Hubbert (born June 5, 1941 in Boligee, Alabama) is an American former collegiate and professional football player.

See also
Other American Football League players

References

1941 births
Living people
People from Boligee, Alabama
American football running backs
Arizona Wildcats football players
San Diego Chargers players
American Football League All-Star players
American Football League players
Players of American football from Alabama